Chatrud District is a district (bakhsh) in Kerman County, Kerman Province, Iran. At the 2006 census, its population was 24,678, in 5,946 families.  The district has two cities: Chatrud and Kazemabad. The district has two rural districts (dehestan): Kavirat Rural District and Moezziyeh Rural District.

References 

Kerman County
Districts of Kerman Province